Malcolm Purcell McLean (November 14, 1913 – May 25, 2001; later known simply as Malcom McLean) was an American businessman. He was a transport entrepreneur who invented the modern intermodal shipping container, which revolutionized transport and international trade in the second half of the twentieth century. Containerization led to a significant reduction in the cost of freight transportation by eliminating the need for repeated handling of individual pieces of cargo, and also improved reliability, reduced cargo theft, and cut inventory costs by shortening transit time. Containerization is credited as being one of the main drivers of globalization.

Early life
McLean was born in Maxton, North Carolina in 1913. His first name was originally spelled Malcolm, though he used Malcom later in life.

In 1935, when he finished high school at Winston-Salem, his family did not have enough money  to send him to college, but there was enough for Malcolm to buy a used truck.

The same year, McLean, his sister, Clara McLean, and his brother, Jim McLean, founded McLean Trucking Co. Based in Red Springs, North Carolina, McLean Trucking started hauling empty tobacco barrels, with Malcolm as one of the drivers.

Containerization

The idea of transporting trucks on ships was put into practice before World War II. In 1926 regular connection of the luxury passenger train from London to Paris, Golden Arrow/Fleche d'Or,  by Southern Railway and French Northern Railway began. For transporting passengers' baggage, four containers were used. These containers were loaded in London or Paris and carried to ports, Dover or Calais, on flat cars in the UK and “CIWL Pullman Golden Arrow Fourgon of CIWL” in France.

In the early 1950s, McLean decided to use the containers commercially. By 1952, he was developing plans to carry his company's trucks on ships along the U.S. Atlantic coast, from North Carolina to New York. It soon became apparent that  "trailerships", as they were called, would be inefficient because of the large waste in potential cargo space on board the vessel, known as broken stowage. The original concept was modified into loading just the containers, not the chassis, onto the ships, hence the designation container ship or "box" ship. At the time, U.S. regulations would not allow a trucking company to own a shipping line.

McLean secured a bank loan for $22 million, and in January 1956 bought two World War II T-2 tankers, which he converted to carry containers on and under deck. McLean oversaw the construction of wooden shelter decks, known as Mechano decking. This was a common practice in World War II for the carriage of oversized cargo, such as aircraft.  It took several months to refit the ships, construct containers to carry on and below the vessels' decks and design trailer chassis to allow removable containers.

On April 26, 1956, with 100 invited dignitaries on hand, one of the converted tankers, the SS Ideal-X (informally dubbed the "SS Maxton" after McLean's hometown in North Carolina), was loaded and sailed from  the Port Newark-Elizabeth Marine Terminal, New Jersey, for the Port of Houston, Texas, carrying 58  Trailer Vans, later called containers, along with a regular load of liquid tank cargo.  As the Ideal-X left the Port of Newark, Freddy Fields, a top official of the International Longshoremen's Association, was asked what he thought of the newly fitted container ship.  Fields replied, "I'd like to sink that son of a bitch."  McLean flew to Houston to be on hand when the ship safely docked.

In 1956, most cargoes were loaded and unloaded by hand by longshore workers.  Hand-loading a ship cost $5.86 a ton at that time.  Using containers, it cost only 16 cents a ton to load a ship, 36-fold savings. Containerization also greatly reduced the time to load and unload ships.  McLean knew "A ship earns money only when she's at sea", and based his business on that efficiency.

In April 1957, the first container ship, the Gateway City, began regular service between New York, Florida, and Texas. During the summer of 1958 McLean Industries, still using the name Pan-Atlantic Steamship Corporation, inaugurated container service between the U.S. and San Juan, Puerto Rico with the vessel Fairland. The name was officially changed from Pan-Atlantic Steamship Corporation to Sea-Land Service, Inc. in April 1960. McLean's operation was profitable by 1961 and he kept adding routes and buying bigger ships.

In August 1963, McLean opened a new  port facility in Port Newark-Elizabeth Marine Terminal to handle even more container traffic.  The development of the container market was slow until the late 1960s. Many ports did not have the cranes to lift containers on and off ships, and change was slow in an industry steeped in tradition.  Moreover, unions resisted an idea that threatened their livelihood.

In April 1966, Sea-Land commenced service between New York and Rotterdam, Bremen and Grangemouth (Scotland).

IN 1967, Sea-Land was invited by the U.S. Government to start a container service to South Vietnam. The service to Vietnam produced 40% of the company's revenue in 1968/69.

In late 1968, commercial container ship service was inaugurated from the Far East to the United States. This service was expanded to Hong Kong and Taiwan in 1969, and to Singapore, Thailand and the Philippines in 1971.

To achieve reductions in labor and dock servicing time, McLean followed Roy Fruehauf's lead and became vigilant about standardization. His efforts to increase efficiency resulted in standardized container designs that were awarded patent protection. McLean made his patents available by issuing a royalty-free lease to the International Organization for Standardization.

By the end of the 1960s, Sea-Land Industries had 27,000 trailer-type containers, manufactured by Fruehauf, 36 trailer ships and access to over 30 port cities.

As the advantages to McLean's container system became apparent, competitors quickly adapted. They built bigger ships, larger gantry cranes and more sophisticated containers. Sea-Land needed cash to stay competitive.  McLean turned to Reynolds Tobacco Company, a company he knew from his trucking company days when his trucks transported Reynolds cigarettes across the United States.  In January 1969, Reynolds agreed to buy Sea-Land for $530 million in cash and stock.  McLean made $160 million personally and got a seat on the company's board.  To carry out the purchase, Reynolds formed a holding company, named R.J. Reynolds Industries, Inc., which bought Sea-Land in May 1969.  That same year, Sea-Land ordered five of the largest, fastest container ships in the world - SL-7 class vessels.

Under Reynolds, Sea-Land's profits were intermittent.  By the end of 1974, Reynolds had put more than $1 billion into Sea-Land, building huge terminals in New Jersey and Hong Kong and adding to its fleet of container ships.

Sea-Land's biggest expense was fuel, so in 1970, RJR bought the American Independent Oil Co., better known as Aminoil, for $56 million.  RJR put millions into oil exploration, trying to get Aminoil large enough to compete in the world exploration market.

In 1974, R.J. Reynolds Industries had its best year. Sea-Land's earnings increased nearly 10 times, to $145 million. Aminoil's earnings soared to $86.3 million.  Dun & Bradstreet, the financial-ratings firm, named RJR one of its five best-managed companies in America.  But in 1975, Sea-Land's earnings dropped sharply, along with Aminoil's.  McLean relinquished his Reynolds board seat in 1977 and cut ties with the company.

In June 1984, R.J. Reynolds Industries, Inc. spun off Sea-Land Corporation to shareholders, as an independent, publicly held company, with stock trading on the New York Stock Exchange. Sea-Land achieved the highest revenues and earnings in its 28-year history.

In September 1986, Sea-Land Corporation merged with CSA Acquisition Corp., a subsidiary of CSX Corporation. Sea-Land Corporation common stock was exchanged for $28 per share, cash.

Sea-Land's international services were sold to Maersk in 1999, and the combined company was named Maersk Sealand, which, in 2006, became known simply as Maersk Line.

The former Sea-Land's domestic services was operated until 2015 as Horizon Lines, which accounted for approximately 36% of the total U.S. marine container shipments between the continental U.S. and the markets of Alaska, Hawaii and Puerto Rico, and to Guam. The company was headquartered in Charlotte, North Carolina. In 2015 the company was acquired by Matson Navigation Company.

Subsequent business ventures
In 1968 McLean financed a real estate project in Waveland, Mississippi that has become Diamondhead, Mississippi.

In 1971, the Pinehurst Resort property in Pinehurst, North Carolina was sold to Diamondhead Corporation, a land development company headquartered in a Mountainside, New Jersey and owned by McLean. The venerable old resort which had seen virtually no noticeable changes in its 75 years before its sale became the center of controversy. Finally, in 1982, Pinehurst became the property of Diamondhead's major lenders, who formed a NC corporation called Resort Assets Corporation. With their takeover, a more viable effort was then made to work in concert with Pinehurst village officials to restore the overall community.

In 1978, McLean purchased United States Lines. There, he built a fleet of 4,400-TEU container ships that were the largest afloat at the time. The ships, operating in round-the-world service, were designed in the aftermath of the 1970s oil shortages and were fuel-efficient but slow, and therefore not well-adapted to compete in the subsequent period of cheap oil. USL went bankrupt in 1986.  McLean took very personally the criticism directed against him after the collapse of USL and the resulting loss of many jobs associated with and dependent on USL.

In 1982, McLean made the Forbes 400 Richest Americans list with a net worth of $400 million, however, a few years later, having gambled on rising oil prices that failed to materialize, McLean had to file for Chapter 11 bankruptcy owing debt of $1.3 billion.

In 1991, at 78, McLean founded Trailer Bridge, Inc., which operates between the US mainland (Jacksonville, Florida), Puerto Rico and the Dominican Republic.

McLean also developed non-maritime inventions, including a means of lifting a patient from a stretcher onto a hospital bed.

Death
McLean died at his home on the East Side of Manhattan on May 25, 2001, age 87, of heart failure.  His death prompted Norman Y. Mineta to make the following statement:

In an editorial shortly after his death, Baltimore Sun stated that "he ranks next to Robert Fulton as the greatest revolutionary in the history of maritime trade." Forbes Magazine called McLean "one of the few men who changed the world."

On the morning of McLean's funeral, container ships around the world blew their whistles in his honor.

Honors
Fortune inducted McLean into its Business Hall of Fame in 1982.  In 1995, American Heritage named him one of the ten outstanding innovators of the past 40 years. In 2000, he was named Man of the Century by the International Maritime Hall of Fame.

McLean was inducted into the Junior Achievement U.S. Business Hall of Fame in 1982.

In 2000, McLean received an honorary degree from the U.S. Merchant Marine Academy.

McLean is the only person to found three companies that were later listed on the New York Stock Exchange (plus two others on the NASDAQ).

Trailer Bridge, Inc., which McLean founded in 1992, annually awards the Malcom P. McLean Innovative Spirit Award.  The annual McLean Award recognizes an outstanding graduating student at George Mason University, selected by professors.

McLean was inducted into the North Carolina Transportation Hall of Fame in 2006.

Notes and references
 Footnotes

 References
Marc Levinson. (2016, 2nd ed.). - The Box: How the Shipping Container Made the World Smaller and the World Economy Bigger. - Princeton, New Jersey: Princeton University Press.
Marc Levinson. (2020). Outside the Box: How Globalization Changed from Moving Stuff to Spreading Ideas.  Princeton University Press.
Brian J. Cudahy. (2006). - Box Boats: How Container Ships Changed the World. - Fordham University Press
Frank Broeze. (2002). - "The Globalization of the Oceans: Containerization from the 1950s to the Present". - International Maritime Economic History Association.
The Container Revolution at sname.org

External links
Photo of Ideal-X, the first container ship
 Ideal-X and McLean

.
"The Box That Built the Modern World: How shipping containers made distance irrelevant." By Andrew Curry, July 25, 2013, Nautilus

1913 births
2001 deaths
People from Maxton, North Carolina
American businesspeople in shipping
20th-century American inventors
20th-century American businesspeople
Businesspeople from North Carolina